The Lion Electric Company (in French, La Compagnie Électrique Lion) is a Canadian-based manufacturer of commercial vehicles.  Currently the biggest electric vehicle manufacturer in its segment, Lion primarily produces yellow school buses, public transit buses, semi-trucks, bucket trucks, and garbage/refuse trucks — all products featuring zero-emission battery-electric powertrains.

Founded in 2011 as Lion Bus (Autobus Lion), the company is headquartered in Saint-Jérôme, Quebec. It was listed on both the Toronto Stock Exchange and the New York Stock Exchange in May 2021 (TSE: LEV and NYSE: LEV, respectively).

History

Autobus Lion (2011-2017) 
The first school bus manufacturer founded in North America in the 21st century, Autobus Lion/Lion Bus is also the first manufacturer of full-size school buses in Canada since the closure of Les Enterprises Michel Corbeil in 2007.  Lion Bus was created in 2008 by former Corbeil executives Marc Bédard and Camile Chartrand (serving as Lion President and retired COO, respectively). 

In 2011, the company introduced its first bus, the Lion 360°, a cowled-chassis (conventional style) school bus, produced in a partnership with Spartan Chassis, Inc.  In contrast to other manufacturers of full-size buses, the 360 was offered by itself, to streamline production costs.

La Compagnie Électrique Lion (2017-present) 
In June 2017, Lion Bus rebranded itself as the Lion Electric Company.  As part of the transition, the company announced the development of a second bus design, a flat-floor fully electric minibus for school and transit applications (later unveiled as the LionM and LionA, respectively).  In addition, Lion announced the development of Class 5-8 fully electric trucks, with a planned launch in fall 2018.

In November 2017, Power Energy (a wholly owned subsidiary of Power Corporation Canada), announced a major investment in Lion Electric.  In the summer of 2018, the company established a base of operations in central California.

In 2021, Lion announced a new manufacturing facility in Joliet, Illinois to produce its electric buses and trucks, and became a public company by merging with a special-purpose acquisition company (SPAC). In May 2021, Lion received an order from First Student for 260 electric buses, its largest order at that point.

Products

Lion 360° 
Launched in 2011, the Lion Bus 360° is a cowled-chassis (conventional) bus sold as either a school bus, MFSAB (activity bus), or a commercial-use bus.  As with the Blue Bird Vision, the 360 does not use a chassis and hood of a production medium-duty truck, instead having a proprietary chassis developed for the bus by Spartan Chassis (a subsidiary of Spartan Motors, former parent company of Carpenter).  Though few body configurations were initially offered (to streamline production), the 360 was offered with options such as wheelchair lifts or underfloor luggage compartments.

In its development, several features of the 360 focused on lengthening the service life of school buses.  In the interest of corrosion resistance, the body does not use steel exterior panels, consisting of composite body panels, with the lower bodywork using TPO panels.  In a break from school bus design precedent, the 360 is produced with a 102-inch wide body (rather than 96 inches); the change was intended for either wider center aisles or to better accommodate 3-point seatbelts.

In May 2015, Lion unveiled a CNG-fueled variant of the 360, becoming the first manufacturer to produce a Type C school bus powered by a CNG-fueled engine.  Powered by a NGV Motori version of the International DT466 engine, it is unclear how many were produced.

Lion eLion (LionC) 
Launched in 2015, the eLion is a fully electric vehicle, sharing its body and Spartan chassis with the 360.  In place of the Cummins diesel, a 250 KiloWatt TM4 SUMO MD electric motor is used along with LG lithium-ion batteries.  The eLion is externally distinguished from the 360 by its colored bumpers, which are either painted blue or green.

LionM/LionA/LionD 
Launched in 2018, the LionM (originally the eLionM) is a low-floor midibus/minibus produced in a 26-foot length.  Offering kneeling and an integrated wheelchair ramp, the LionM was developed for transit, paratransit, and shuttle applications.  The LionA is a Type A school bus, adopting the axle configuration of a much larger Type D bus. with a larger school bus called LionD.

The LionM and LionA are equipped with either one or two 80 kWh LG Chem lithium-ion battery packs mounted below the floor, allowing for either a 75-mile or 150-mile driving range.  Alongside a 19.2 kW J1777 charger, DC fast-charging is an option, along with battery swapping.

Lion8 
Introduced in March 2019, the Lion8 is a Class 8 fully electric truck, produced in a cabover configuration.  Developed primarily for urban and vocational use, the Lion8 currently has a range of 250 miles.  It is equipped with a  TM4 SUMO HD electric motor and a 480 kWh battery.

See also

 School bus
 Spartan Motors - chassis supplier

References

External links
Lion Electric Company website (English)
Spartan Motors Lion Bus Chassis Specifications 

School bus manufacturers
Bus manufacturers of Canada
Saint-Jérôme
Vehicle manufacturing companies established in 2011
Motor vehicle manufacturers based in Quebec
Companies listed on the New York Stock Exchange
Companies listed on the Toronto Stock Exchange